Aframomum mildbraedii is a species of plant in the ginger family, Zingiberaceae. It was first described by Ludwig Eduard Theodor Loesener.

References 

mildbraedii